Rose-painting,  or  is a Scandinavian decorative folk painting that flourished from the 1700s to the mid-1800s, particularly in Norway. Rose-painting was used to decorate church walls and ceilings. It then spread to wooden items commonly used in daily life, such as ale bowls, stools, chairs, cupboards, boxes, and trunks. Using stylized ornamentation made up of fantasy flowers, scrollwork, fine line work, flowing patterns and sometimes geometric elements give rose-painting its unique feel. Some paintings may include landscapes and architectural elements. Rose-painting also utilizes other decorative painting techniques such as glazing, spattering, marbleizing, manipulating the paint with the fingers or other objects. Regional styles of rose-painting developed, and some varied only slightly from others, while others may be noticeably distinct.

Etymology and terminology
The first element can also be interpreted as a reference to the rose flower, but the floral elements are often so stylized that no specific flower is identifiable, and are absent in some designs.

In Sweden the style was traditionally called rosmålning, with cupboard decorations said to be utkrusat i rosmålning or krusmålning. Dalamålning refers to Dalarna, with which the style is particularly associated;  the term appeared around 1901. Kurbits originally derived from the Latin Cucurbita, and refers to a long-bodied gourd. The poet Erik Axel Karlfeldt, who wrote about the painted wall hangings of Dalarna, popularized the term in the 1920s, particularly in his 1927 poem "Kurbitsmålning".

History in Norway

Rosemaling in Norway originated in the lowland and rural areas of eastern Norway, particularly in the Telemark, Valdres, Hallingdal, Numedal, Setesdal, Gudbrandsdalen, and in other valleys in Vest-Agder, Hordaland, Sogn og Fjordane, and Rogaland. It came into existence in the early 1700s, when Baroque and Rococo artistic styles of the upper class were introduced into Norway's rural culture. Since no rose-paintings can be traced back before this time, there is an indication that folk traditions within Norway went through a period of change and evolution. Once developed, regional styles of rosemaling began to emerge. Some varied only slightly from others, while others were noticeably distinct. In the middle of the 18th century, more and more individuals became painters and carvers. Due to this, rosemaling styles boomed to included even more unique forms. Rose-painters also began to initial their work as a way to identify the pieces they created. Through this, historians have been more easily able to gauge how many pieces certain artists have done, and even identify dynasties of painters through family relation. Rosemaling's popularity, however, declined by the mid-19th century.

Rosemaling designs use "C" and "S" shaped brushstrokes that feature scroll and flowing lines, floral designs, and both subtle and vibrant colors. Script lettering, scenes, animal and human figures may also be included. For instance, when Norway was still ruled by the Danes, some artists would create rose-paintings of the Danish King and Queen or of Danish warriors. Artists who specialized in rosemaling often came from poorer classes in the countryside. They would travel from county to county painting churches, homes and furnishings for a commission of either money or merely room and board. Thus rosemaling was carried over the mountains and toward Norway's western coast. Once farther away from the influence of the painters' guild, these artists tried new ideas and motifs. Rosemaling became widespread as amateur artists in rural areas often imitated this folk art. Soon, strong regional styles developed, and today the three main styles are Telemark, Hallingdal and Rogaland, named after the regions in which each originated.

Rosemaling is, in a sense, the two-dimensional counterpart of acanthus carving, since it is clear that the C and S curves in rosemaling take their inspiration from the acanthus carvings of Baroque and Rococo art and the acanthus carvings in the rural churches (for example the altar reredoses and pulpits) and homes (for example cupboards) were painted in the same bright colors as used in rosemaling. While in the cities these acanthus carvings were generally gilded, the rural artisans did not have ready access to gold leaf as their urban counterparts and so painted their carvings in the bright colors whose popularity in rural communities is seen also in the traditional Norwegian rural dress, the bunad. Like rosemaling, acanthus carving has had a cultural revival in recent times as both a means of interior design (for example, on furniture, picture frames, and door and window frames) and as a personal hobby, although most modern acanthus carving is left unpainted and unvarnished.

An anecdote about the Nazi occupation of Norway (1940–1945) is that at a time when the public display of the Norwegian flag or the State Coat of Arms could bring imprisonment or even death, the Norwegians discovered that they could display the 'H' overlapping the '7' of the Royal cypher of their exiled king, Haakon VII, at the center of a rosemaling design without the German occupation forces seeing anything but a colorful peasant design. Christmas cards with the Royal cypher at the center of a rosemaling design were especially popular; many have survived and their history documented. 

Currently, this specific type of folk art is becoming popularized in a more mobile way. Back in the 1700s when the first piece of rose-painting was done in Norway, it was only visible in remote locations such as inside homes and churches. Now, however, rose-painting is being executed on bowls, vases, plates, chests, jewelry boxes, and a multitude of furniture items. This expansion in rose-painting has not only allowed it to remain popular, but it has given it the ability to do more than just be seen in museums such as the Norwegian Folk Museum. Many shops in Norwegian tourist cities sell various unique rose-painted items from local at-home artists. They are a must see by not only tourists, but the overall citizens of the cities. At a shop, rose-painted items can be sold for quite an income due to the fact that these items are made the traditional way (hand-painted) rather than industrially processed. Each item is carefully crafted and unique. The process behind these items is quite extensive and can take time. For instance, wood items begin with first applying special oil-based paint or wood stain. This color normally tends to be a deeper blue or red, dusty pink, white, black, or even brown. When the rose-painting is complete, it will be sold based on its intricacy and size of design. Something as simple as a large bread tray can be sold for as much as 240 dollars.

In terms of the design of current rose-paintings, it holds much similarities to past rose-paintings in Norway. Since rosemaling in Norway simply means "decorative painting," there are still many other designs besides floral or rose depictions. It can involve agricultural landscapes, scenes from historical events, life in the rural or countryside areas, and more. Some even are known for depicting scenes from children's stories or fairytales. One of the most commonly rose-painted children's story is "Little Red Riding Hood." Furthermore, more and more styles have since emerged after the most famous Telemark, Hallingdal, and Rogaland styles.

While shops and museums will most likely contain rose-paintings from all areas of Norway, rose-painting is currently most prominent in the southern parts of Norway. In specific, the regions Telemark and Hallingdal are booming with this folk art. Regardless of being most popular in the southern region of Norway, however, the rose-paintings still do vary quite decently from city to city. This is why the styles have always been regionalized and regionally named. For instance, Telemark tends to produce rose-painting with a more exaggerated and ornate style. It follows an 18th-century French influence and inspiration. Hallingdal, on the other hand, produces its own style of work. These artists, unlike many others, tend to prefer selling their work privately rather than within shops.

Overall, rose-painting in Norway is something that has become partially industrialized. Individuals can buy rose-painted items from commercial stores and industries for a cheaper price. Industrialized rose-painting started back when the interiors of homes began to become more modernized. Certain items, such as the invention of chimneys, made Norwegians feel the need to decorate more parts of their home. This led to the expansion of rose-paintings and an industrialized version that was more accessible and economically affordable for everyday citizens. However, that is also why individuals who buy rose-painted items from tourist shops and private artists must be willing to pay a higher price; they are buying a traditionally made item. These hand-crafted goods are just as important as the industrialized goods because they help to maintain the Norwegian culture of rosemaling and keep it from fully disappearing. Norwegians view rosemaling as a way to keep a shared identity and culture among their entire nation. This is why certain places to this day, such has the Nordic Museum and Chicago Public Library, display a multitude of rose-paintings.

History in Sweden
In Sweden, it is a style of painting featuring light brush strokes and depictions of gourds, leaves, and flowers, used especially in the decoration of furniture and wall hangings, and was adopted by both artists and artisans in rural Sweden, reaching its greatest popularity in the latter half of the 18th century. While rose painting was popular among the entire nation, lots of times the houses of more wealthy individuals had more rose paintings as they were able to afford more decorations. In addition, the major popularity of rose painting in Sweden occurred before the industrialization period. After industrialization, it did not disappear due to the fact that the art created during this period was recognized as a major part of Sweden's folk culture and heritage.

The tradition of painted wall hangings in this style was fully developed around 1820. The paintings were done by itinerant painters, most from Dalarna, whose signatures can be found in many localities. The artists learned it as a trade or handicraft from one another, and copied each other's works; some pieces have been found copied more than 140 times. Artists also used stamps to create small details in patterns. Those from the Rättvik school of art were more likely to add spontaneous leaves and flowers, breaking up the symmetry of their pieces. Scenes were based on Bible illustrations, with people and buildings rendered in the then current styles. The gourds reference a Biblical legend about Jonah sitting beneath a gourd; the gourd symbolizes vegetal fertility. The most common themes of kurbit art are the wedding at Cana, Jonah preaching, the entry of the Queen of Sheba,  the three wise men, Jesus riding into Jerusalem, the story of Joseph, the ten virgins, the crowning of Salomon, and the vineyard.

The style is widely found in the regions of Dalarna and southern Norrland, and today kurbits can refer to the painting of furniture, tapestry, Dala horses, or Swedish folk painting as a general concept. On the Dala horse, a gourd is used to indicate the saddle.

Kurbits artists include Winter Carl Hansson of Yttermo and Back Olof Andersson, who painted in 1790–1810. 

The kurbits style was used in the candidate city logo of the Stockholm-Åre bid for the 2026 Winter Olympics, forming the year "2026".

History in America
Norwegian immigrants brought the art of rosemaling to the United States. Immigration from Norway to America first began in the 1830s. It is not surprising this specific form of folk art was brought to America by Norwegian immigrants since it was not just used for decoration and aesthetic purposes in Norway, but also for self-definition. Rosemaling was a way for Norwegian-Americans to keep a hold of some of their heritage. During this time period of immigration, immigrants did just that, and they maintained a strong ethnic identity both privately and publicly. They might have specific traditions within in their homes, participate in ethnic festivals, and more. Rose paintings were often displayed in theses festivals. In addition, lots of immigrants traveling from Norway to the Midwest regions of America would actually create rose paintings in churches on their travel to make some money. These rose paintings done by travelers helped expand the variation of styles among rose paintings.

The art form experienced a revival in the 20th century as Norwegian-Americans became interested in the rosemaling-decorated possessions of their ancestors. Rosemaling artists whose work was recognized by newspapers and magazines allowed the art form to be further recognized and grow. One prominent rosemaling artist Per Lysne, who was born in Norway and emigrated to Wisconsin, was trained in the craft. Lysne is often considered the father of rosemaling in the U.S. As the revival continued on, it reached its peak in the 1960s to the 1980s. In the late 1960s, Vesterheim Norwegian-American Museum in Decorah, Iowa began to exhibit rosemaling. The museum then began bringing Norwegian rosemalers to the U.S. to hold classes. The style's popularity boomed in the U.S., even among non-Norwegians. Other classes can be found throughout the country, especially in areas where Norwegians settled.

The Swedish settlement of Lindsborg, Kansas is known for Dala horses among other celebrations of its heritage.

Currently, rose painting is still most common in the Upper Midwest. This is due to the fact that when Norwegians most heavily migrated between the 1840s and 1910s, they ended up living in the Upper Midwest. In addition, the Norwegian-American Museum is still offering workshops on rosemaling. Besides workshops, rosemaling can also be taught through books, classes, and heritage centers. This is very valuable as it offers more ways for Norwegian-Americans (and other Americans) to pass on rosemaling skills and traditions to future generations.

To this day, there is now a decent amount of Norwegian-Americans from the Upper Midwest who have taken on rose painting, causing some of their styles to be considered "Americanized." Rather than being seen as a piece of Norwegian heritage, it is seen as a piece of Upper Midwest communities. Some rosemaling styles have been "Americanized" beginning between 1930 and 1960. Compared to traditional styles, often they included brighter colors, special ornamental details, and more. Dane County, Wisconsin, which developed a style known as American Rogaland and American Telemark style found in Milan, Minnesota.

Styles 
There are many different styles of rosemaling. Typically, each style is named after the region it is most commonly used in. To begin, the first style that has gained major popularity is the Telemark style. This style is extremely popular in Norway, and it is very impromptu. It normally involves a root center that has floral depictions or branches swirling out from it. Within the Telemark style, there are also two other styles. The transparent Telemark, which has light enough brush strokes to almost be seen through, and the American Telemark, which is a combination of both the regular Telemark style and the transparent Telemark style. Another popular style in Norway is Hallingdal. Hallingdal is different from Telemark in that the paint is often less translucent and more bold in color. In addition, it has much more symmetry and pattern to it. In addition to these, the Rogaland style also has some popularity. This style consists of more floral images than lines or scrolls. It often will have a darker background with a central flower surrounded by leaves and other decorations. While those three forms are popular, there still are other forms as well. For instance, another style is the Valdres style. The Valdres style is one that has some of the most realistic looking floral designs.

Gallery

References

Further reading
Nils Georg Brekke, "Dalmålningarna som rosmålning: Ikonologiske studier i eit jamførande perspektiv", in: Nils-Arvid Bringéus and Margareta Tellenbach, eds., Dalmålningar i jämförande perspektiv: föreläsningar vid bildsymposiet i Falun och Leksand den 13-16 september 1992, Falun: Dalarnas Museum, 1995 
Diane Edwards, Design Basics for Telemark Rosemaling, self-published, Alamosa, Colorado, 1994, 
Sybil Edwards, Decorative Folk Art: Exciting Techniques to Transform Everyday Objects, London: David & Charles, 1994, 
Margaret M. Miller and Sigmund Aarseth, Norwegian Rosemaling: Decorative Painting on Wood, New York: Charles Scribner's Sons, 1974, 
Gayle M. Oram, Rosemaling Styles and Study, Volume 2, Vesterheim Norwegian-American Museum, 2001
Harriet Romnes, Rosemaling: An Inspired Norwegian Folk Art, self-published, Madison, Wisconsin, 1951, repr. 1970

External links

Folk art
Norwegian culture
Norwegian migration to North America
Norwegian-American culture
Painting techniques
18th century in Sweden
19th century in Sweden
Dalarna
Swedish art